Paththini is a 1997 Indian Tamil-language drama film, written and directed by P. Vasu. The film stars Jayaram and Khushbu, while Prakash Raj and Janagaraj portray supporting roles. The music for the film was composed by Deva and the film opened to mixed reviews in September 1997.

Cast
Jayaram
Khushbu
Prakash Raj
Janagaraj
Thyagu
Charle

Production
After making several unsuccessful films during the mid 1990s, P. Vasu made a comeback with Vaimaye Vellum (1997) and the good performance of the film, fetched him an opportunity from Good Luck Films to make Paththini, said to be loosely based on the Hollywood film, Sleeping with the Enemy (1991). The venture saw the team from the successful 1993 film Purusha Lakshanam collaborate again with the producers, director, actor and actress returning to make Paththini.

Music
The soundtrack was composed by Deva. Lyrics were written by Vaali, Kalidasan, Piraisoodan and Valampuri John.

Release & reception
The film opened to mixed reviews in September 1997, and did not perform well at the box office. Deccan Herald wrote "Pathini, if not for its connotations, is a film full of overworked themes. Not really worth seeing at all".

Awards 
The film won two awards during the following year from the Tamil Nadu state — the Best Film portraying Women in Good Light and the Special Prize for actress Khushbu.

References

1997 films
1990s Tamil-language films
Films scored by Deva (composer)
Films directed by P. Vasu
Indian drama films
Films about domestic violence